is the debut single of AKB48 member Yuki Kashiwagi. It was released on February 6, 2013 by Avex Group under its YukiRing brand, named after Kashiwagi's nickname Yukirin.

Track listing

Tie-ups
 TV Tokyo:  opening theme and insert song (tracks 1 and 2)

Chart performance

References

External links
 

2013 songs
Avex Group singles
2013 debut singles
Japanese television drama theme songs
Songs with lyrics by Yasushi Akimoto